Eagle Point Provincial Park is a provincial park in central Alberta, Canada. It is located along the banks of the North Saskatchewan River within Brazeau County to the east and northeast of the Town of Drayton Valley. Recreation in Eagle Point Provincial Park include, Canoeing, Biking, Hiking, and Fishing. Animals within the park include Pine Martens, River Otters, North American beaver, American Black Bear, Belted Kingfisher, Osprey, Great Grey Owl, and Mule Deer.

Eagle Point was officially designated as a provincial park by an order in council on August 29, 2007.

References

External links 
Alberta Parks – Eagle Point Provincial Park

Provincial parks of Alberta
Brazeau County